Kandu Kandarinju is a 1985 Indian Malayalam-language film starring Mammootty, Mohanlal, Nadhiya, Rahman, Menaka, Lalu Alex. The film is directed by Sajan.

Plot
Sreedharan is struggling after the death of his father. He has an unmarried sister, Ammini, who was pregnant with her boyfriend's child six years ago. His younger brother Kunjunni is in college but gets bullied by his classmates. He gets help from the girl Aswathy to fight against them. Meanwhile, Ammini is visited by her lover, Krishnanunny, who is suspected of having murdered Sreedharan's father, but there is no direct evidence. There, Krishnanunny sees his own young son.

Aswathy is forced to marry her brother's friend who killed Kunjunni's father. Sreedharan's girlfriend was nearly raped by Grasscourt Kumar, but she was saved by Krishnanunny. Sreedharan's mother, Janaki, finally admits to him that it was someone else, that Kumar's friend had killed his father, and not Krishnanunny, who was there for Ammini and their young son.

Cast
 Mammootty as Sreedharan
Mohanlal as Krishnanunny
Rahman as Kunjunni 
Nadia Moidu as Aswathy 
Menaka as Ammini 
Lalu Alex as Grasscourt Kumar 
Jalaja as Padmam 
Sivaji as Sivan Pillai 
Sukumari as Janaki 
Mala Aravindan as Kittan 
Master Prasobh as Kuttan
 Adoor Bhavani as Chellamma
 Prathapachandran as Balakrishnan, Sreedharan's father
 Oduvil Unnikrishnan as Bhairavan, Boys hostel warden
 Thodupuzha Vasanthi as Girls hostel warden
 Tony as college student
 Santhosh as Sajan, a college student
 Kothuku Nanappan as College professor

Soundtrack
The music was composed by Shyam and the lyrics were written by Chunakkara Ramankutty and Kala Adoor.

References

External links
 

1985 films
1985 action films
1980s Malayalam-language films
Films directed by Sajan